W. crocea may refer to:

 Walckenaeria crocea, a very small spider
 Woldmaria crocea, a gilled mushroom